Sir Geoffrey Holland, KCB (9 May 1938 – 20 April 2017) was an English career civil servant who became Vice-Chancellor of the University of Exeter from 1994 to 2002, when he was succeeded by Professor Steve Smith. Holland Hall, a large student hall of residence which opened in 2004 on the Exeter campus is named after him.

Early life
Holland was born on 9 May 1938 to Frank Holland CBE and his wife, Elsie Freda Holland. His father was a civil servant for London County Council. Both parents came from the Potteries in north Staffordshire.

He was educated at Merchant Taylors' School, Northwood on a scholarship and spent two years in the Royal Tank Regiment for National Service, becoming a Second Lieutenant. He received a first class BA honours degree in Modern Languages from St John's College, Oxford.

Career
He joined the Ministry of Labour in 1961, working as a civil servant until the 1990s in the Department of Employment, becoming the Permanent Secretary at the Department for Education (DFE) from 1993-4. He was knighted in 1989. In 1994 he became VC of the University of Exeter. He was a member of the National Committee of Inquiry into Higher Education that published an influential report in 1997.

In August 2003, he was appointed Chair of the Learning and Skills Development Agency. In 2006, he was appointed Chair of the Quality Improvement Agency.

From 1998-2000 he was President of the IPD. In 2008 he became President of the Marine Biological Association of the United Kingdom.

Personal life
In 1964 he married Carol Challen.

He died on 20 April 2017 at the age of 78.

External links
 MTSN
 LSDA
 XPedia

References

1938 births
2017 deaths
Civil servants in the Ministry of Labour
Permanent Under-Secretaries of State for Employment
Private secretaries in the British Civil Service
Alumni of St John's College, Oxford
Fellows of St John's College, Oxford
Vice-Chancellors of the University of Exeter
Knights Commander of the Order of the Bath
People educated at Merchant Taylors' School, Northwood